Neko nas posmatra is the seventh and final studio album by Serbian rock band Ekatarina Velika, released in 1993. Contrary to the previous record, it contained more positive and optimistic views. It is the only album that included a cover song, "Istina Mašina" (Truth Machine) by the band Time, the gesture that was a tribute to a Yugoslav musician Dado Topić. The album was produced by Milan Mladenović himself. The guest stars were Srdjan "Žika" Todorović and Tanja Jovićević (backing vocals).

Track listing

Personnel
Milan Mladenović - vocals, guitar
Margita Stefanović - piano, keyboards
Dragiša "Ćima" Uskoković - bass
Marko Milivojević - drums

External links

References

Ekatarina Velika albums
1993 albums